Sir John Bruce, 2nd Baronet (before 1671 – 19 March 1711) was the son of William Bruce, the famous architect, and a member of parliament.

John married Christian Leslie, widow of the Marquess of Montrose and daughter of the Duke of Rothes. In 1702, he succeeded his father as a member of the Parliament of Scotland after William was expelled for his Jacobite sympathies, and was one of the Scottish representatives to the 1st Parliament of Great Britain. John inherited the baronetcy on his father's death in 1710. Following his own death shortly after, the baronetcy became extinct, and the Kinross estate passed to his sister Anne Bruce, who married Sir Thomas Hope, 4th Baronet Hope of Craighall.

External links
 BRUCE, John (d. 1711), of Kinross House, Kinross. at The History of Parliament online

17th-century births
Year of birth uncertain
Year of birth unknown
1711 deaths
Baronets in the Baronetage of Nova Scotia
Shire Commissioners to the Parliament of Scotland
Members of the Parliament of Great Britain for Scottish constituencies
Members of the Parliament of Scotland 1702–1707
British MPs 1707–1708